The 2009–10 La Liga season (known as the Liga BBVA for sponsorship reasons) was the 79th La Liga since its establishment. Barcelona were the defending champions, having won their 19th La Liga title in the previous season. The campaign began on 29 August 2009 ended on 16 May 2010 due to all top-flight European leagues ending earlier than the previous season because of 2010 FIFA World Cup.
A total of 20 teams contested the league, 17 of which already contested in the 2008–09 season and three of which were promoted from the Segunda División. In addition, a new match ball – the Nike T90 Ascente – served as the official ball for all matches.

On 16 May 2010, Barcelona won their 20th La Liga title with a home 4–0 victory over Valladolid. Lionel Messi won the La Liga award for Best Player for the second consecutive time.

Real Madrid's 96 points made them the runners-up with the highest points total in the history of Europe's top five leagues, until surpassed by Liverpool's 97 points in the 2018–19 Premier League.

Promotion and relegation 
Teams promoted from 2008–09 Segunda División
 Xerez CD (debut in top tier)
 Real Zaragoza
 CD Tenerife

Teams relegated to 2009–10 Segunda División
 Real Betis
 CD Numancia
 Recreativo de Huelva

Team information

Stadia and locations

Personnel and sponsoring

Managerial changes

League table

Results

Awards

LaLiga Awards 
La Liga's governing body, the Liga Nacional de Fútbol Profesional, honoured the competition's best players and coach with the LaLiga Awards.

Pichichi Trophy 
The Pichichi Trophy is awarded to the player who scores the most goals in a season.

 Source: futbol.sportec

Zamora Trophy 
The Zamora Trophy is awarded by newspaper Marca to the goalkeeper with least goals-to-games ratio. A goalkeeper must play at least 28 games of 60 or more minutes to be eligible for the trophy.

 Source: futbol.sportec

Fair Play award 
This award is given annually since 1999 to the team with the best fair play during the season. This ranking takes into account aspects such as cards, suspension of matches, audience behaviour and other penalties. This section not only aims to determine the best fair play, but also serves to break the tie in teams that are tied in all the other rules: points, head-to-head, goal difference and goals scored.

 Source: Guia As de La Liga 2010–11, p. 129 (sports magazine)

Source: RFEF Referee's reports, Competition Committee's Sanctions, Appeal Committee Resolutions, Spanish Sports Disciplinary Committee Resolutions and RFEF's Directory about Fair Play Rankings

Pedro Zaballa award 
Atlético Madrid and Sevilla supporters

Season statistics

Scoring 
 First goal of the season:   Raúl for Real Madrid against Deportivo (29 August 2009).
 Last goal of the season:   Rafael van der Vaart for Real Madrid against Málaga (16 May 2010).

Hat-tricks

Discipline 
 First yellow card of the season:  Daniel Aranzubia for Deportivo against Real Madrid (29 August 2009)
 First red card of the season:  Leandro Gioda for Xerez against Mallorca (30 August 2009)

See also 
 List of Spanish football transfers summer 2009
 List of Spanish football transfers winter 2009–10
 2009–10 Segunda División
 2009–10 Copa del Rey

References

External links 

2009/2010
1